The Osterøy Bridge is a suspension bridge in Vestland county, Norway.  The bridge connects the Kvisti farm area on the island of Osterøy in Osterøy Municipality with the Herland farm area on the mainland in Bergen Municipality east of the city of Bergen.  The bridge is the third largest suspension bridge in Norway. It is part of Norwegian County Road 566 (Fylkesvei 566).

There are 8 spans, and none of the piers are in the water, just on land. The bridge was designed by the structural engineering firm Aas-Jakobsen.

It was put into service 28 years after the first plans for a connection between Osterøy and Bergen were prepared. It was opened for traffic by Sissel Rønbeck, the Norwegian Minister of Transport and Communications.  The bridge was built to withstand quite strong winds. Experts have indicated that the bridge should be capable of surviving an extreme storm. The bridge is tuned so that its greatest oscillation occurs when the wind is about  such as a light breeze.

Media gallery

References

External links

Bridges completed in 1997
Suspension bridges in Norway
Road bridges in Vestland
Osterøy
1997 establishments in Norway
Road bridges in Bergen
Toll bridges in Norway